Mutiny is a conspiracy to openly oppose, change or overthrow an authority to which they are subject.

Mutiny or mutineer(s) may also refer to:

Film and television
 Mutiny (1925 film), a silent British film directed by Floyd Martin Thornton
 Mutiny (1928 film), a Soviet   film directed by Semyon Tymoshenko
 Mutiny (1952 film), an American film directed by Edward Dmytryk on the War of 1812
 Mutiny (2002 film), a television film part of the Hornblower series
 Mutiny (1999 film), a television drama film 
 "Mutiny" (Falling Skies), an episode of the American science fiction TV series Falling Skies
 "Mutiny" (Space: Above and Beyond episode)
"Mutiny", the 22nd episode of Code Lyoko: Evolution

Music 
 Mutiny (band), an Australian folk punk band
 Mutiny (funk band), an American funk band led by Jerome "Bigfoot" Brailey
 The Mutineers, a band that became known as Five Americans
 Mutineer (album), a 1995 album and song by Warren Zevon
 Mutineers (album), a 2014 album by David Gray
 Mutiny (Too Much Joy album), 1992
 Mutiny!, a 2006 album by Set Your Goals
 "Mutiny", 1985 song by The Family from The Family
 "Mutiny", 2005 song by Parkway Drive from Killing with a Smile 
 "Mutiny", 2008 song by Pendulum from In Silico 
 "Mutiny", 1988 song by Running Wild from Port Royal 
 "Mutiny!", 2006 song by Set Your Goals from Mutiny!

Other uses
 Mutiny, a play by Christopher Bond
 Indian Rebellion of 1857, also known as the Indian Mutiny
 Mutiny Collective, an Australian anarchist group based in Sydney
 Tampa Bay Mutiny, a professional soccer club

See also